Tashly-Yelga (Taşlıyılğa) is a rural locality (a village) in Lemezinsky Selsoviet, Iglinsky District, Bashkortostan, Russia. The population was 23 as of 2010. There is 1 street.

Geography 
Tashly-Yelga is located 56 km east of Iglino (the district's administrative centre) by road. Ulu-Karamaly is the nearest rural locality.

References 

Rural localities in Iglinsky District